The 2014 Wofford Terriers football team represented Wofford College in the 2014 NCAA Division I FCS football season. They were led by 27th-year head coach Mike Ayers and played their home games at Gibbs Stadium. They were a member of the Southern Conference. They finished the season 6–5, 4–3 in SoCon play to finish in fourth place.

Schedule

Source: Schedule

References

Wofford
Wofford Terriers football seasons
Wofford Terriers football